Fire on the Amazon is a 1993 American-Peruvian adventure drama film directed by Luis Llosa and starring Craig Sheffer and Sandra Bullock.

Plot

In Bolivia's Amazon basin, corporate cattle ranches are replacing the rain forest. When Santos, the charismatic leader of the union of rubber tappers, forges an alliance with Natives to protest deforestation, he is assassinated. R.J. O'Brien, a US photo-journalist who has no skills as an investigator, wants a story when he thinks the police have framed and murdered an innocent Native as the assassin. In his search for the truth, he involves Alyssa Rothman; who worked for Santos, and who he falls in love with and vice versa. As he gets deeper into trouble with the cops and the real assassin, he needs not only Alyssa's help, but also that of the Natives' leader.

Cast
Craig Sheffer as R.J. O'Brien
Sandra Bullock as Alyssa Rothman
Juan Fernández as Ataninde
Judith Chapman as Sandra
Ramsay Ross as Pistoleiro
David Elkin as Lucavida
Jorge García Bustamante as Valdez
Baldomero Cáceres as Pedro
Carlos Victoria as Miguel
Reynaldo Arenas as Djamori
Eduardo Cesti as Rafael Santos

Production
As reported on A&E's Biography on November 18, 2005, in an interview clip with the film's director, the film was a harrowing experience in many ways. Bullock was concerned that the canoe she was riding could have possibly tipped over and dumped her in dangerous waters.

External links
 including Theatrical Trailer at New Horizons Pictures

https://www.amazon.com/Fire-Amazon-Sandra-Bullock/dp/B004JMDB88

1993 films
1993 drama films
English-language Peruvian films
Peruvian adventure drama films
1990s adventure drama films
Films directed by Luis Llosa
Films about journalists
1990s English-language films
American adventure drama films
1990s Spanish-language films
American multilingual films
1990s Peruvian films
1990s American films